Veldt, or veld, is a term specifically referring to the open grasslands in southern Africa.

Veldt may also refer to:
 "The Veldt" (short story), a science fiction story by Ray Bradbury
 The Veldt (band), an American alternative group
 The Veldt (film), a 1987 Soviet film based on the story by Ray Bradbury
 "The Veldt" (song), a song by deadmau5, also based on the Bradbury story
 An open landscape continent of the world with tribal sensibilities and music from Final Fantasy VI, a 1994 video game

See also
VELD Music Festival
Veldt Township, Marshall County, Minnesota
Tim Veldt, a Dutch track cyclist